Meet the Eels: Essential Eels, Vol. 1 (1996–2006) is a greatest hits compilation to celebrate the tenth anniversary of rock band Eels, featuring a DVD of music videos, behind-the-scenes photos, and commentary by Mark Oliver Everett. It was released on January 15, 2008 in the United States and January 21, 2008 in the United Kingdom, where it debuted on the UK Album Chart at #26.

It was released in conjunction with the B-sides collection Useless Trinkets: B-Sides, Soundtracks, Rarities and Unreleased 1996–2006.

Track listing

CD 
All songs written by E, except where noted:
 "Novocaine for the Soul" (E and Mark Goldenberg) – 3:07
 "Susan's House" (E, Jim Jacobsen, and Jim Weatherly) – 3:56
 "My Beloved Monster" – 2:12
 "Your Lucky Day in Hell" (E and Goldenberg) – 4:28
 "3 Speed" – 2:45
 "Last Stop: This Town" (E and Michael Simpson) – 3:28
 "Climbing to the Moon" (Jon Brion Remix) – 3:56
 "Flyswatter" – 3:17
 "I Like Birds" – 2:33
 "Mr. E's Beautiful Blues" (E and Simpson) – 4:01
 "It's a Motherfucker" – 2:14
 "Souljacker part I" (Butch, E, and Adam Siegel) – 3:16
 "That's Not Really Funny" (E and John Parish) – 3:19
 "Fresh Feeling" (E and Koool G Murder) – 3:39
 "Get Ur Freak On" (Missy Elliott, Ludacris, and Timbaland) – 3:29
 "Saturday Morning" (E and Koool G Murder) – 2:55
 "Love of the Loveless" – 3:32
 "Dirty Girl" (Live at Town Hall) – 3:00
 "I Need Some Sleep" – 2:29
 "Hey Man (Now You're Really Living)" – 3:02
 "I'm Going to Stop Pretending That I Didn't Break Your Heart" – 3:55
 "Trouble with Dreams" – 4:34
 "Railroad Man" (Edit) – 3:38
 "Losing Streak" – 2:50

DVD 
 "Novocaine for the Soul"
 "Susan's House"
 "Rags to Rags"
 "Your Lucky Day in Hell"
 "Last Stop: This Town"
 "Cancer for the Cure"
 "Flyswatter"
 "Souljacker part I"
 "Saturday Morning"
 "Hey Man (Now You're Really Living)"
 "Trouble with Dreams"
 "Dirty Girl" (Live at Town Hall)

Original releases for tracks 
 1–4: Beautiful Freak
 5–6: Electro-Shock Blues
 7: previously unreleased, original version on Electro-Shock Blues
 8–11: Daisies of the Galaxy
 12–14: Souljacker
 15: previously unreleased cover of Missy Elliott, from the album Miss E... So Addictive
 16–17: Shootenanny!
 18: Eels with Strings: Live at Town Hall
 19: Shrek 2: The Motion Picture Soundtrack
 20–24: Blinking Lights and Other Revelations (track 23 edited from 4:16 for length)

Certifications

References

External links 
 Eels page on the compilations

Eels (band) compilation albums
Eels (band) video albums
Music video compilation albums
2008 greatest hits albums
2008 video albums
DreamWorks Records compilation albums
DreamWorks Records video albums
Universal Records compilation albums
Universal Records video albums
Albums produced by Mark Oliver Everett
Albums produced by John Parish
Albums produced by Mickey Petralia